Charles Edwin Major (1859 – 1 June 1954) was a New Zealand politician of the Liberal Party, from Taranaki.

He was a Member of Parliament for Hawera in the 15th and 16th parliaments, from 1902 to 1908, having failed to win election in 1899.

He was defeated in 1908, when he stood in the Patea electorate.

He later contested the Manukau electorate in the 1919 general election, placing third.

References

1859 births
1954 deaths
19th-century New Zealand politicians
New Zealand Liberal Party MPs
Unsuccessful candidates in the 1896 New Zealand general election
Unsuccessful candidates in the 1899 New Zealand general election
Unsuccessful candidates in the 1908 New Zealand general election
Unsuccessful candidates in the 1919 New Zealand general election